Declan O'Dwyer (born 1 June 1987) is a hurler who plays for Naomh Ólaf and has represented Dublin in the past.

O'Dwyer won a Leinster Minor Hurling Championship medal with Dublin in 2005.

He won the Leinster Under-21 Hurling Championship with Dublin against Offaly in July 2007. It was Dublin's first Under-21 trophy since 1972.

More recently he Declan played a pivotal role in Dublin's league campaign which brought them to their first Div 1 league title since 1939.

Declan learned his trade at Naomh Olaf under the management of Fran Meegan. Mr Meegan passed on his wealth of knowledge from management (Franagment) of Super Valu Mount Merrion to Declan from a young age, coaching and mentoring him all through his hurling career. Declan also played under the tenure of Liam McLoughlin at St. Benildus College, Kilmacud, Dublin. He achieved success at both U16 and Senior level with St. Benildus.

Honours
 National Hurling League (1): 2011
 Leinster Under-21 Hurling Championship (1): 2007
 Leinster Minor Hurling Championship (1): 2005

External links
 Official Dublin GAA Website

Living people
1987 births
Dublin inter-county hurlers
Naomh Ólaf hurlers